Ulan-Ude is the capital city of the Buryatia, Russia, located about  southeast of Lake Baikal on the Uda River at its confluence with the Selenga. According to the 2021 Census, 437,565 people lived in Ulan-Ude; up from 404,426 recorded in the 2010 Census, making the city the third-largest in the Russian Far East by population.

Names
Ulan-Ude was first called Udinskoye for its location on the Uda River. It was founded as a small fort in 1666. From around 1735, the settlement was called Udinsk and was granted town status under that name in 1775. It was renamed Verkhneudinsk ("Upper Udinsk") in 1783, to differentiate it from Nizhneudinsk ("Lower Udinsk") lying on a different Uda River near Irkutsk which was granted town status that year.

The descriptors "upper" and "lower" refer to the positions of the two cities relative to each other, rather than the location of the cities on their respective Uda rivers. Verkhneudinsk lies at the mouth of its river, while Nizhneudinsk is along the middle stretch. The current name was given to the city on 27 July 1934 and means "red Uda" in Buryat, reflecting the ideology of the Communist Party of the Soviet Union.

Geography

Hydrography
Ulan-Ude is traversed by two rivers, the Selenga and Uda. The Selenga provides the greatest inflow to Baikal Lake, supplying 50% of all rivers in its basin. Selenga is the habitat of the most valuable fish species such as Omul, Siberian sturgeon, Siberian taimen, Thymallus and Coregonus.

Uda is the right inflow of the Selenga river.

History

The first occupants of the area where Ulan-Ude now stands were the Evenks and, later, the Buryat Mongols. Ulan-Ude was settled in 1666 by the Russian Cossacks as the fortress of Udinskoye. Due to its favorable geographical position, it grew rapidly and became a large trade center which connected Russia with China and Mongolia and, from 1690, was the administrative center of the Transbaikal region.

By 1775, it was known as Udinsk, and in 1783 it was granted city status and renamed Verkhneudinsk. After a large fire in 1878, the city was almost completely rebuilt. The Trans-Siberian Railway reached the city in 1900 causing an explosion in growth. The population, which was 3,500 in 1880, reached 126,000 in 1939.

From 6 April to October 1920, Verkhneudinsk was the capital of the Far Eastern Republic (Дальневосточная Республика), also known as the Chita Republic. It was a nominally independent state that existed from April 1920 to November 1922 in the easternmost part of the Russian Far East. On 27 July 1934, the city was renamed Ulan-Ude.

Administrative and municipal status

Ulan-Ude is the capital of the republic. Within the framework of administrative divisions, it is incorporated as the city of republic significance of Ulan-Ude — an administrative unit with the status equal to that of the districts. As a municipal division, the city of Ulan-Ude is incorporated as Ulan-Ude Urban Okrug.

Demographics
According to the 2010 Census, 404,426 people lived in Ulan-Ude; up from 359,391 recorded in the 2002 Census. In terms of population, it is the third-largest city in eastern Siberia.

The ethnic makeup of the city's population in 2010:
Russians: 63.6%
Buryats: 32.7%
Ukrainians: 0.6%
Tatars: 0.5%
Others: 2.6%

Transportation

Ulan-Ude is located on the main line (Trans-Siberian line) of the Trans-Siberian Railway between Irkutsk and Chita at the junction of the Trans-Mongolian line (the Trans-Mongolian Railway) which begins at Ulan Ude and continues south through Mongolia to Beijing in China.

The city also lies on the M55 section of the Baikal Highway (part of the Trans-Siberian Highway), the main federal road to Vladivostok. Air traffic is served by the Ulan-Ude Airport (Baikal), as well as the smaller Ulan-Ude Vostochny Airport. Intracity transport includes tram, bus, and marshrutka (share taxi) lines.

Culture

Until 1991, Ulan-Ude was closed to foreigners. There are old merchants' mansions richly decorated with wood and stone carving in the historical center of Ulan-Ude, along the river banks which are exceptional examples of Russian classicism. The city has a large ethnographic museum which recalls the history of the peoples of the region. There is a large and highly unusual statue of the head of Vladimir Lenin in the central square: the largest in the world.

Sights

The Ethnographic Museum of the peoples of Transbaikal is one of Russia's largest open-air museums. The museum contains historical finds from the era of the Slab Grave Culture and the Xiongnu until the mid 20th century, including a unique collection of samples of wooden architecture of Siberia – more than forty architectural monuments.

Odigitrievsky Cathedral – Eastern Orthodox Church Diocese of the Buryat, was the first stone building in the city and is a Siberian baroque architectural monument. The cathedral is considered unique because it is built in a zone of high seismic activity in the heart of the city on the banks of the River Uda River where it flows into the Selenga.

One of the attractions of Ulan-Ude is a monument in the town square — the square of the Soviets — in the form of the head of Lenin (sculptors G.V. Neroda, J.G. Neroda, architects Dushkin, P.G. Zilberman).

The Voice of Nomads international music and culture festival is held annually at various sites in the city.

Economy
The Ulan-Ude Aviation Plant is based in Ulan-Ude.

Mongol Rally
Ulan-Ude serves as the endpoint for the Mongol Rally.

Climate
Ulan-Ude can be described as possessing a humid steppe climate (Köppen climate classification BSk), bordering on a humid continental climate (Dwb) and a subarctic climate (Dwc). The climate is characterised by long, dry, cold winters and short but very warm summers. Precipitation is low and heavily concentrated in the warmer months.

Notable people
Dmitry Masleev, pianist
Oksana Omelianchik, artistic gymnast
Irina Pantaeva, Sports Illustrated model
Alexander Slastin, actor
Inna Stepanova, Olympic archer
Gunsyn Tsydenova, politician

Twin towns - sister cities

Ulan-Ude is twinned with:

 Anyang, South Korea
  Berkeley, USA
 Changchun, China
 Chita, Russia
 Darkhan, Mongolia
 Donetsk, Ukraine
 Elista, Russia
 Erdenet, Mongolia
 Erenhot, China
 Grozny, Russia
 Haeju, North Korea
 Hohhot, China
 Hulunbuir, China
 Lanzhou, China
 Manzhouli, China
 Rumoi, Japan
 Taipei, Taiwan
 Ulaanbaatar, Mongolia
 Ulanqab, China
 Yalta, Ukraine
 Yamagata, Japan
 Yeongwol County, South Korea

Notes

References

Sources

 
Transbaikal Oblast
Populated places established in 1666
17th-century establishments in Russia
1666 establishments in Russia
Russian Far East